Brao people are an ethnic group that live on both sides of the Cambodia-Laos border.
There are approximately 60,000 Brao people, broadly defined, worldwide. They mainly live in Attapeu and Champasak Provinces in southern Laos, and Ratanakiri and Stung Treng Provinces in northeastern Cambodia. In Cambodia, the Brao include people from the following sub-groups: Amba, Kreung, Kavet, Brao Tanap, and Lun. In southern Laos, they belong to the Jree, Kavet, Lun, Hamong and Ka-ying sub-groups 

 Brao people speak various dialects of the Brao language, a Western Bahnaric Mon–Khmer language of Cambodia and Laos. 

 Sometimes the Brao people are confused with the Bru, or the Brou, a Katuic Mon-Khmer language speaking group found in Khammouane and Savannakhet Provinces in southern Laos, and adjacent areas of Viet Nam. Some Bru people also live in northeastern Thailand. 

The main religion of Brao is Animism, although “a small minority of the Brao in northeast Cambodia have recently converted to forms of evangelical Christianity.” Brao variety of Animism focuses on appeasing “a wide array of malevolent spirits who manifest in various contexts and ways.” Most rituals “require the consumption of a particular form of fermented rice-beer” as well as “sacrificing chickens, pigs, and water buffaloes and, less frequently, cows.”

Some people confuse the Brao and the Brou/Bru because an anthropologist, Jacqueline Matras, who wrote about a Brao Tanap village in Ratanakiri Province, but spelt their name "Brou". However, linguists agree that the proper name is Brao.

See also
 Brau people

References

External links

Tribus du nord-est (Ratanakiri)
Hill Tribes: Brao, Jaraim Kavet, Krung, Phnong, Tampoeun

Ethnic groups in Cambodia
Ethnic groups in Laos
Indigenous peoples of Southeast Asia